Rudolf Batz (10 November 1903 – 8 February 1961) was a German SS functionary during the Nazi era.  From 1 July to 4 November 1941 he was the leader of Einsatzkommando 2 and as such was responsible for the mass murder of Jews and others in the Baltic states. Arrested in 1961, Batz committed suicide while in custody awaiting trial.

Biography 
Batz was born in Bad Langensalza in Thuringia.  After a course of studies in jurisprudence at the University of Göttingen, he joined the Nazi Party on 1 May 1933.  On 10 December 1935 he joined the Schutzstaffel (SS).  By 1942 he was promoted to the rank of Obersturmbannführer.

At the beginning of the German invasion of the Soviet Union he was the leader of a unit of about 40 men, Einsatzkommando 2 of Einsatzgruppe A, and was responsible for overseeing the mass murder of the Jews of the Baltic states. In 1943, Batz became commander of Sicherheitspolizei (SiPo; Security Police) in Cracow and shortly after that became the head of the Gestapo in Hannover.

After the war, Batz lived unrecognized for a long time in West Germany. He was arrested in 1961. Batz hanged himself in custody while awaiting trial.

References

Sources 
 Krausnick, Helmut and Wilhelm, Hans-Heinrich: Die Truppe des Weltanschauungskrieges: Stuttgart: DVA, 1981

External links 
  Biography and photograph at olokaustos.org 

1903 births
1961 suicides
People from Bad Langensalza
Holocaust perpetrators in Latvia
Holocaust perpetrators in Lithuania
Holocaust perpetrators in Estonia
Holocaust perpetrators in Poland
Einsatzgruppen personnel
SS-Standartenführer
Nazis who committed suicide in prison custody
Gestapo personnel
Nazis who committed suicide in Germany
Suicides by hanging in Germany
Lawyers in the Nazi Party
University of Göttingen alumni
Police of Nazi Germany